Charles François "Tippy" de Lanoy Meijer (born 16 November 1943) is a retired field hockey player from the Netherlands. He competed  at 1968 Summer Olympics, where his team finished in fifth place.

References

External links
 

1943 births
Living people
Dutch male field hockey players
Field hockey players at the 1968 Summer Olympics
Olympic field hockey players of the Netherlands
People from Vianen
Sportspeople from Utrecht (province)
20th-century Dutch people